Sexton Blake and the Demon God is a 1978 six-part British BBC miniseries starring Jeremy Clyde as the fictional detective Sexton Blake. It was scripted by Simon Raven, directed by Roger Tucker and produced by Barry Letts.  The serial was broadcast by BBC One at tea-time from Sunday, 10 September 1978, until Sunday, 15 October 1978. Like the 1967–1971 Sexton Blake series, it is set in the 1920s.

Synopsis
In 1927, Sexton Blake investigates a mystery involving a stolen Egyptian mummy, an ancient curse and a cult that dabbles in human sacrifice.

Cast
Jeremy Clyde as Sexton Blake
Philip Davis as Tinker 
Barbara Lott as Mrs Bardell
Derek Francis as Hubba Pasha
Natasha Parry as Cassandra
Linal Haft as Maremma Bey
John Biggerstaff as Watchman
John Carlin as Dr Paterson
Vic Tablian as Zigiana's uncle
Jacquey Chappell as Zigiana
Sonny Caldinez as Abdullah
Moti Makan as Camden novice
Darien Angadi as Camden priest
George Pravda as Professor Lurkov
Eddie Molloy as Manley
Barry Martin as Mordecai
Ronald Russell as Hotel manager
William Lawford as French train official
Richard Simpson as Parkins
Timothy Kightley as Mason
Farrell Sheridan as Lurkov's manservant
Michael Forrest as Greek Police Chief
Harry Tradios as Greek Police Sgt
Alkis Kritikos as Greek servant
Maria Moustaka as Guardian of the Snake
Jaron Yaltan as Egyptian priest
Ahmed Osman as Egyptian guard
Stephen Thorne as Voice of Chemos

Novel
The novelisation by John Garforth was published the same year. It was the last Sexton Blake novel published in the 20th century.

References

Fiction about mummies
Television series set in the 1920s
Television shows set in Greece
1970s British drama television series
1978 British television series debuts
1978 British television series endings
BBC Television shows
Television shows adapted into novels
Sexton Blake